The IAI Rotem L or IAI Rotem - Light is a loitering munition developed by the Israel Aerospace Industries. The drone is a quadcopter that can  loiter for 30–45 minutes with the maximum range of 10 km. It can carry 1 kg warhead that could be two fragmentation grenades.

Rotem L can be operated by a single soldier. Unlike many other loitering drones, Rotem has the significant feature that it can be reused once aborts the mission, and safely lands in a safe location.

Specifications

References

External links 

 IAI ROTEM L - Multiblade Loitering Munition
 Israel Made a Kamikaze Quadcopter from Hell
 The Quadrotor Drone That Carries a Warhead

Harop
Single-engined pusher aircraft
Harop
Loitering munition